This is a list of years in German television.

Twenty-first century

Twentieth century

See also 
 List of years in Germany
 Lists of German films
 List of years in television

Television
Television in Germany by year
German television